Tropomodulin-3 is a protein that in humans is encoded by the TMOD3 gene.

References

Further reading

Tropomodulin